Philip Kay is a British contemporary composer and producer. He is also a founding member of the band Working For A Nuclear Free City.

In 2013 Kay won the Music + Sound Award for best composition for his score to The Guardian "Three Little Pigs" long-form commercial. In 2014. he released his debut solo record under the name King Of The Mountains entitled Zoetrope.

Originally from Manchester, England, Kay lives and works in London.

Discography 
 Working For A Nuclear Free City - Working For A Nuclear Free City (Melodic Records, 2007)
 Working For A Nuclear Free City - Jojo Burger Tempest (Melodic Records, 2010)
 Motorifik - Secret Things (Modern Language, 2011)
 Gary McClure - Wreaths (AED, 2013)
 King Of The Mountains - Zoetrope (Melodic, 2014)

References

Year of birth missing (living people)
Living people